The American Chamber of Commerce in the People's Republic of China (AmCham China) is a nonprofit, nongovernmental organization whose membership comprises 4,000 individuals from 900 companies operating across China. The chamber's mission is to help American companies succeed in China through advocacy, information, networking and business support services. The chamber provides information, networking opportunities, business support services, and advocacy to promote a mutually beneficial bilateral business environment for the U.S. and China.

AmCham China is the only officially recognized chamber of commerce representing American businesses in Mainland China.  AmCham China has more than 50 industry- and issue-specific forums and committees.  These working groups serve as a platform for the American business community and other organizations in China to foster understanding, share information, pursue common interests, promote trade and investment, and strengthen cooperation.

AmCham China's headquarters are located in Beijing. In addition to a Tianjin Chapter, it has a Central China Chapter based in Wuhan and a Northeast China Chapter with offices in Dalian and Shenyang.

In December 2020, AmCham China stirred controversy and criticism by hosting Wang Chen, a U.S. sanctioned member of the Chinese Communist Party (CCP), at its annual appreciation dinner.

History
The first American Chamber of Commerce in Beijing (then Peking) was established in 1919, with eight founding member companies, including Standard Oil. The organization disbanded when war broke out, and the chamber did not reform until 1981. AmCham China was formally registered with the Ministry of Civil Affairs in 1991. As a non-partisan, not-for-profit organization dedicated to supporting and promoting the business success of its members, AmCham China is not affiliated with any branch of government.

Structure
AmCham China is a member-led organization rooted in the vision, hard work, and dedication of its members, many of whom are leaders within their companies and the business community. Currently, its national level operations are guided by the Chairperson, three Vice-Chairpersons, and 10 governors who comprise the organization's Board of Governors. All voting members of AmCham China are eligible to participate in an annual election to select the Board.

Chapters
AmCham China's headquarters are located in Beijing's Central Business District. It also has a Central China Chapter in Wuhan, a Northeast China Chapter in Dalian and Shenyang, and a Tianjin Chapter. The three chapters are headed by Chapter Executive Committees that cater specifically to regional members. These executive committees ensure that every Chapter is responsive to the needs of local AmCham China members.

Board of Governors
The Board of Governors consists of 14 voting individuals: the Chairperson, three Vice-Chairpersons, and 10 governors. The Treasurer, the General Counsel, the President, the most recent former Chairperson of the Board of Governors, and the Chairperson of the Executive Committee of any Chapter serve as non-voting ex-officio members.
The Board of Governors is responsible for overseeing and making policy decisions for AmCham China. It meets to discuss ongoing matters of the chamber at least six times per year. The Board also selects and appoints the President to supervise and direct all employees of the Chamber.

Chairperson
The Chairperson must be a citizen of the United States and have a record of active participation in the Board of Governors, a Chamber committee, or a Chamber forum within the two years prior the election. The Chairperson is eligible for two one-year terms, but it is possible for former Chairpersons to run again for additional non-consecutive terms. At the end of one's term, the former Chairperson may continue serving as a non-voting ex-officio member of the Board unless otherwise elected as a regular Board member.

In addition to playing a general supervisory role in AmCham China's organizational development, the Chairperson presides over all Board of Governors meetings, executes the decisions of the Board of Governors, appoints the head of each committee and forum, and represents the chamber in external relations. The Chairperson also appoints the Treasurer and General Counsel of the Board of Governors.

List of Past Chairpersons
2016–present William "Bill Zarit"
2015-2016 James Zimmerman
2013-2014 Greg Gilligan
2011-2012 Ted Dean
2009-2010 John D. Watkins, Jr.
2007-2008 James Zimmerman
2005-2006 Emory Williams, Jr.
2004 Jim Gradoville
2002-2003 Christian Murck
2000-2001 Timothy P. Stratford
1999 Richard Latham
1998 (Second half) Min-Hwa Hu Kupfer
1998 (First half) Rudy Schlais
1997 John Holden
1996 James L. McGregor
1995 William Warwick
1994 Phil Carmichael
1992-1993 John Hart 
1990 Irl Hicks
1989 Lucille Barale
1985-1986 Sally Harpole
1983-1984 Peter Lighte

Vice-Chairpersons
The three Vice-Chairpersons provide consultation and assume appropriate roles as designated by the Chairperson. In the Chairperson's absence, a Vice-Chairperson may preside over meetings and assume the Chairpersonship in the case of the Chairperson's resignation.

Election Committee
The Election Committee supervises and reviews the election process for Board of Governors positions. It is selected by the Board of Governors from voting members of AmCham China. Election Committee members are prohibited from running for any position on the Board of Governors in the upcoming election, and current officers or members of the Board of Governors may not serve on the Election Committee.

Membership
AmCham China's membership includes 4,000 individuals and 900 companies. For an annual fee, membership is offered to major multinational companies, small and medium-sized enterprises, non-profit organizations, entrepreneurs, and other individuals involved with China.

Categories
In 2000, AmCham China specified 10 different membership categories for businesses, nonprofits, and individuals. The Board of Governors then introduced five streamlined membership options in 2012. The new main categories are as follows:

1) Large corporate: companies with global revenue of at least US$50 million.

2) Small corporate: companies with global revenue between 1 million and US$50 million.

3) Other corporate: companies with global revenue of less than US$1 million.

4) Individual: US citizens who are entrepreneurs or work for non-US companies

5) Other professionals: US citizens who work for nonprofits or educational institutions, and young professionals between 18 and 30 years of age or senior professionals over 60 years of age.

Benefits
Members enjoy exclusive content from AmCham China's monthly magazine, weekly business-focused e-newsletters, podcasts, and round-ups of top Chinese news stories. They have the opportunity to collaborate and learn about industry trends through participation in more than 40 specific committees and forums. Many AmCham China members also take advantage of the diverse membership community to expand their professional network beyond their own industries. Public-private partnership programs in aviation, energy, and healthcare supplement regular networking and informational events for comprehensive exposure to different fields.

Additional benefits of membership include assistance through the business visa program, online job postings, health insurance provision, AmCham China's powerful government relations platform, the M2M intra-chamber marketing program, a member discounts program, and exclusive member prices for over 150 annual AmCham China events.

Publications 
American Business in China White Paper

For two decades, the annual American Business in China White Paper has been one of AmCham China's signature products and codifies members’ collective insights on the current business climate in China, while setting the chamber's official position regarding high-priority issues that affect the American business community in China. The White Paper also serves as an annual assessment of the progress made on policies and regulations and is a key platform for discussion and engagement with the Chinese and U.S. government.

The White Paper includes an annual Recommendation Scorecard measuring progress in a wide range of policy areas. The 2017 White Paper found the most significant progress in banking and capital markets regulation, business sustainability and non-profit engagement. Meanwhile, several areas, including agriculture, automotive policy, and securities investment saw little or no legislative progress.

Business Climate Survey Report

The annual AmCham China Business Climate Survey (BCS) enhances the Chinese and US governments’ understanding of AmCham China's member companies’ concerns regarding China's regulatory and policy environment, as well as the daily business challenges companies face when operating in China. Further, the survey is a useful tool for AmCham members to measure their operations and compare their business outlooks and strategies with the broader community.

Additionally, the BCS report includes recommendations for businesses and policymakers. The 2015 report concluded that "A top priority for both Chinese and US policymakers should be the pursuit of a high standard US-China BIT to improve the ability of US companies to invest and innovate in China on an even playing field to the benefit of China's future economy."

Business Now Magazine

Business Now is AmCham China's flagship publication, released both online and in print six times annually. The magazine circulates to thousands of AmCham China's card-holding members, U.S. and Chinese government officials and businesses around Beijing, Tianjin, Dalian, Shenyang, and Wuhan.

The magazine provides insights on the U.S.-China business environment, penned by chamber members, in-house policy analysts, and staffers. Each issue includes such features as a cover story addressing a current issue, a report on policy changes and their implications for business, member commentaries, book reviews, and in-depth interviews with senior business leaders.

Activities
AmCham China is involved in an expansive range of programs and services. Its signature activities help members succeed in China by providing government advocacy, a wide range of networking opportunities, valuable information and intelligence, and comprehensive business support services.

Forums and Committees
Over 40 industry- and issues-specific working groups at AmCham China are driven by the interests and needs of member companies. They provide exposure, create bridges, and facilitate information exchange in specialized business areas. Working groups’ policy work also contribute to the annual AmCham China White Paper, which reaches the US and Chinese governments as the definitive document on the state of American business in China.

Working groups include, but are not limited to, the Aerospace Forum, Clean Tech Committee, Environmental Industry Forum, Financial Services Forum, Intellectual Property Rights Forum, Oil, Energy, and Power Forum, Real Estate and Development Industry Forum, Standards Forum, Business Sustainability Committee, Customs and Trade Committee, Legal Committee, Women's Professional Committee, and Young Professionals Committee.

US-China Aviation Cooperation Program
For more than 14 years, the Civil Aviation Administration of China (CAAC), the Federal Aviation Administration (FAA), the U.S. Trade and Development Agency (USTDA), and the Transportation Security Administration (TSA) have worked together to promote U.S.-China aviation cooperation through a unique public-private partnership known as the U.S.-China Aviation Cooperation Program (ACP).

Building on the history of aviation cooperation that began in the 1970s, the US-China Aviation Cooperation Program (ACP) promotes continued industry-wide collaboration between China and the United States. Formally founded in 2004, the government-industry partnership streamlined American companies’ interactions with the CAAC.

Each year, ACP programs millions of dollars of assistance with help from ACP's 36 U.S. member companies. This work is a win-win for both countries, with aviation playing an important and growing role in the overall U.S.-China economic relationship.
  
There also are other bilateral aviation agreements—U.S.-China Bilateral Aviation Safety Agreement, Bilateral Air Services Agreement; and Airworthiness, and Flight Standards Dialogues that provide the framework and standards to support the work of ACP's respective industries.
Its flagship publication is a quarterly magazine called Partnership. ACP is endorsed by both the US and Chinese governments, drawing from the partnership of six public members and 36 corporate members.

US-China Healthcare Cooperation Program
The U.S. – China Healthcare Cooperation Program (HCP) is a collaborative initiative, founded in 2011, based on a joint public-private partnership in healthcare announcement, striving to build closer working relations between the U.S. and China governments while leveraging healthcare industry strengths in order to foster long-term cooperation with China in the areas of technology, public health, policy research, training, and R&D, and to support the Chinese government's goal of enhancing patient access to healthcare services in China. 
Government agencies, including the US Department of Health and Human Services (HHS), U.S. Department of Commerce, US Trade and Development Agency (USTDA), the National Health and Family Planning Commission of China, and Ministry of Commerce of China, have participated and provided guidance in this program. The Program follows two highly successful, siting US-China public-private partnerships that operate under AmCham China's umbrella (Aviation Cooperation Program and the Energy Cooperation Program).

HCP membership includes 27 companies and 7 non-profit organizations and associations, covering healthcare services, medical devices, pharmaceutical companies, medical insurance, healthcare IT, consulting and various other areas. The Program features four working groups addressing key issues shaping healthcare development in China, including Hospital management and Healthcare IT, Healthcare Financing, Disease Prevention & Health Management, and Quality & Safety that each host various workshops, trainings, and study tours."

US-China Energy Cooperation Program (ECP)’s mission is to act as a bilateral public private partnership platform to facilitate business cooperation between US and Chinese companies, advance sustainable development in the energy industry and combat climate change. Since its inauguration, the US-China Energy Cooperation Program (ECP) has actively engaged in in-depth exchanges and cooperation with the relevant government agencies, industry groups, scientific research institutions and enterprises of the United States and China. At present, more than 20 Chinese companies have long-term strategic cooperation agreements. Each year ECP holds business workshops and field visits in a dozen of provinces. ECP's working groups cover a range of issues including energy supply, energy systems and integration, energy demand, crosscutting support.

Export Compliance Working Group
Established in 2006, the Export Compliance Working Group (EGWG) draws from membership companies of AmCham China as well as AmCham Shanghai. Its focus is information-sharing, collaboration, and policy recommendations for US-China high-tech trade.

US-China Agriculture & Food Partnership
The U.S. - China Agriculture & Food Partnership seeks to resolve problems and create opportunities for the improved coordination and development of the U.S. - China food and agriculture industries. Since 2013, it has linked the public, private, and NGO sectors to promote food security, safety, and sustainability.

The U.S. - China connection is the indispensable relationship of the 21st Century – and food and agricultural trade is a key strategic pillar of the overall bilateral economic partnership. U.S. and Chinese agriculture and food linkages are expected to deepen further because of tremendous potential synergies driven by different endowments of land, labor and capital. To be sure, the relationship has yet to reach its fullest potential. The overall agricultural trading relationship is robust and has tremendous growth potential. However, continuing trade frictions, the influence of non-agricultural issues, and perhaps underdeveloped links between the U.S. and Chinese agriculture and food industries have all diminished what should be a fully positive and mutually beneficial relationship. However, with the continuing emergence of China's middle class, persistent concerns about food prices, and the development of competitive food and agricultural firms on both sides of the Pacific, there is tremendous potential for further trade, investment and cooperation.

The U.S. - China Agriculture & Food Partnership focuses specifically on changing both the tone and substance of the bilateral relationship. By resolving problems and creating opportunities through increased coordination, more effective issue advocacy and the development of a more positive relationship between the U.S. and Chinese food and agriculture industries. The organization also serves as a platform to connect business with relevant government entities in a more coherent way and builds upon themes of food safety, food security and sustainable agriculture.

Business Visa Program
AmCham China’s Business Visa Program was designed with the US Embassy to facilitate quick and convenient visa processing for the Chinese employees of qualified member companies. Although US Embassy officials ultimately decide whether or not applicants secure visas to the United States, this service speeds up the process.

AmCham China Business Center
The AmCham China Business Center was launched in 2014 as a one-stop resource for people considering doing business in China. It offers a news bureau, industry reports, and business analysis pertinent to specific sectors. A service directory enables research into potential partners. Visitors to the website can also ask questions to a long-time business expert affiliated with AmCham China.

Criticism
In December 2020, Bloomberg News reported that AmCham China hosted Wang Chen, a sanctioned member of the CCP, at its annual appreciation dinner.

Following the report, US Congressman Michael McCaul, Lead Republican on the House Committee on Foreign Affairs said in a statement, "It is unconscionable for the American Chamber of Commerce in China to host a Chinese Communist Party official under U.S. sanctions at its annual appreciation gala. If American businesses are being forced to celebrate and toast Party officials who trample our values, then the U.S. government must continue to do all it can to protect our national interests. I trust AmCham China and its Board of Governors will explain this truly regrettable and disappointing decision in a transparent manner to their companies and Congress without delay. Their reputation as a credible voice of American business depends on it."

References

China
Business organizations based in China